In complex geometry, an Inoue surface is any of several complex surfaces of Kodaira class VII. They are named after Masahisa Inoue, who gave the first non-trivial examples of Kodaira class VII surfaces in 1974.

The Inoue surfaces are not Kähler manifolds.

Inoue surfaces with b2 = 0
Inoue introduced three families of surfaces, S0, S+ and S−, which are compact quotients
These Inoue surfaces are solvmanifolds.

The solvmanifold surfaces constructed by Inoue all have second Betti number . These surfaces are of Kodaira class VII, which means that they have  and Kodaira dimension .

These surfaces have no meromorphic functions and no curves.

K. Hasegawa  gives a list of all complex 2-dimensional solvmanifolds; these are complex torus, hyperelliptic surface, Kodaira surface and Inoue surfaces S0, S+ and S−.

The Inoue surfaces are constructed explicitly as follows.

Of type S0
Let  This group is a lattice in solvable Lie group

This action is clearly holomorphic, and the quotient  is called Inoue surface of type 

The Inoue surface of type S0 is determined by the choice of an integer matrix φ, constrained as above. There is a countable number of such surfaces.

Of type S+
Let n be a positive integer, and  be the group of upper triangular matrices

The quotient  is called Inoue surface of type

Of type S−
Inoue surfaces of type  are defined in the same way as for S+, but two eigenvalues a, b of φ acting on  have opposite sign and satisfy ab = −1. Since a square of such an endomorphism defines an Inoue surface of type S+, an Inoue surface of type S− has an unramified double cover of type S+.

Parabolic and hyperbolic Inoue surfaces
Parabolic and hyperbolic Inoue surfaces are Kodaira class VII surfaces defined by Iku Nakamura in 1984. They are not solvmanifolds. These surfaces have positive second Betti number. They have spherical shells, and can be deformed into a blown-up Hopf surface.

Parabolic Inoue surfaces contain a cycle of rational curves with 0 self-intersection and an elliptic curve. They are a particular case of Enoki surfaces which have a cycle of rational curves with zero self-intersection but without elliptic curve. Half-Inoue surfaces contain a cycle C of rational curves and are a quotient of a hyperbolic Inoue surface with two cycles of rational curves.

Hyperbolic Inoue surfaces are class VII0 surfaces with two cycles of rational curves. Parabolic and hyperbolic surfaces are particular cases of minimal surfaces with global spherical shells (GSS) also called Kato surfaces. All these surfaces may be constructed by non invertible contractions.

Notes

Complex surfaces